North/South is a Canadian soap opera created by Floyd Kane and produced by the Halifax Film Company, featuring Cory Bowles. The show ran for one season, airing on CBC Television between July 4 and July 13, 2006.

CBC Television original programming
Canadian television soap operas
2006 Canadian television series debuts
2006 Canadian television series endings
Television series by DHX Media
2000s Canadian drama television series